Badlabazar is a village in Kamrup rural district, in the state of Assam, India, situated on the south bank of river Brahmaputra.

Transport
The village is near National Highway 31  and connected to nearby towns and cities with regular buses and other modes of transportation.

See also
 Baghdoba
 Bagmarachar

References

Villages in Kamrup district